PT Wings Abadi Airlines, operating as Wings Air, is a scheduled commuter passenger low-cost airline based in Jakarta, Indonesia. The airline operates out of Sultan Hasanuddin International Airport in Makassar as well as several other airports around Indonesia. The company was established as a short-haul regional flight service, wholly owned subsidiary of Lion Air and started operations on July 10, 2003 and the airline is currently linking tier-two and tier-three cities in Indonesia as to bypass the airline's congested base in Jakarta.

Destinations

Fleet

 The Wings Air fleet consists of an all-ATR fleet:

Aircraft orders
On 15 November 2009, Wings Air announced that it had signed a deal with ATR worth US$600 million. The deal involved an order for  15 ATR 72-500 aircraft with a further 15 options for ATR's new ATR 72-600 aircraft. The new aircraft replaced the airline's aging Bombardier Dash 8 aircraft and will allow further expansion into smaller airports within Indonesia. The first three ATR 72-500s were delivered in January 2010 and were inaugurated at a ceremony in the tourist and diving destination of Manado.

On 25 February 2011 Lion Air signed an order for 15 new ATR 72s for the Wings Air fleet. The 2009 contract had included options for 15 additional ATR 72-600 aircraft. The deal announced in February 2011 represented the conversion of all 15 options.

On 27 November 2014 Lion Air signed an order for 40 new ATR 72-600 for the Wings Air fleet. It makes Lion Group ATR's largest customer of.

Former aircraft
 Bombardier Dash 8-300
 McDonnell Douglas MD-80

Accidents and incidents 
 On 25 December 2016, Wings Air Flight 1896, an ATR 72-600 carrying 52 passengers and crew veered off the runway and crashed on its side while landing in Semarang in bad weather. No one was killed in the crash however six people were treated for shock. The aircraft was substantially damaged. Passengers stated that the undercarriage broke during landing.
 On 5 January 2017, Wings Air flight IW-1372 registration PK-WFP, overran the taxiway while taxiing in Rahadi Osman Airport, Ketapang. The aircraft was carrying 30 passengers and 5 crew. There were no fatalities.

References

External links

  Lion Air website

Airlines of Indonesia
Airlines established in 2003
Airlines formerly banned in the European Union
Lion Air
Indonesian companies established in 2003
Low-cost carriers